Juan Winans is an American singer/songwriter, music producer, and a third-generation member of the Winans family.

Family and early life

Juan Winans was born in Detroit, MI on July 24. The second child of four (Carvin Jr., Joy & Ian) born to Carvin Winans (b. 1958) and Deborah Kerr Winans. His paternal grandparents, David (April 20, 1934 – April 8, 2009) and Delores Winans met each other in 1951, at the ages of 17 and 16 while singing in the Lemon Gospel Chorus. They married two years later; the marriage lasted nearly sixty years, producing ten children. Mom & Pop Winans, as they would come to be known, had seven sons, David Jr, Ronald, Carvin, Marvin, Michael, Daniel, Benjamin, then three daughters, Priscilla, Angelique, and Debra. Both David's father and grandfather were preachers in the Pentecostal church, and he himself raised his ten children in a strict religious home. They taught their children how to sing and they honed their skills performing quartet music at their great grandfather's church. However, it was not until 1980 that Marvin, Carvin, Michael and Ronald were discovered by Andrae Crouch, who signed them to Light Records as The Winans.

On January 1, 1981, Juan's father, Carvin Winans along with three of his brothers released their debut album, Introducing The Winans, embarking on a career that would earn them five Grammy Awards and the title, First Family of Gospel music. In 1987 Juan's uncle and aunt, released their debut album and became internationally known as BeBe & CeCe Winans . Several years later, in 1993, his father's youngest siblings, Angie & Debbie Winans released their debut album.

Career

Winans Phase 2

In the winter of 1997 the Winans were asked to compose and perform a theme song for a Detroit NBC affiliate. They approached their sons about recording the song with them. It was during this time that Juan first expressed an interest in pursuing music, stating in a 1999 interview for CCM magazine, "I don't think I ever aspired to sing before we put this group together". He, along with his older brother, Carvin and two cousins, Marvin Winans Jr and Michael Winans Jr., formed the group Winans Phase 2. In the following year they signed a record deal with Myrrh/Epic Records and began working on their debut album, entitled We Got Next, released in August 1999 with tracks from Rodney Jerkins, Narada Michael Walden, and Babyface. The album debuted at No. 1 on the Billboard Top Gospel Album's chart, and sold over 250,000 copies in the U.S. It was nominated for Best Contemporary Soul Gospel Album at the 42nd Grammy Awards. However they lost the award to Yolanda Adams . The group was also featured on several national television shows including The Oprah Winfrey Show, Donnie & Marie, Soul Train, and the Queen Latifah show. In the spring of 2000 the group performed to crowds in the United Kingdom, Germany, and Amsterdam, promoting the release of We Got Next. A 2002 40-city tour by the entire Winans Family marked the unexpected end of the group.

Juan has never publicly spoken about why Winans Phase 2 never recorded again. However, former members Marvin and Michael have cited "internal problems", and "not really wanting to be an artist" as reasons for the group's breakup.

2003-2007

In 2003 Winans returned to the studio to record background vocals for his uncle BeBe Winans Christmas album My Christmas Prayer. The following year he relocated to Nashville to concentrate on songwriting.

Later in 2004, Juan is credited with singing background vocals on Michelle Williams album, Do You Know, and Smokie Norful's Nothing Without You.

In 2005 Winans, along with Babyface, provided backing vocals for the song "I Said I Love You" from the Kirk Whalum release The Songs of Babyface. He is also credited with singing and arranging background vocals on George Huff's, My Christmas EP. During this time Winans began attending Bethel World Outreach Church in Nashville, TN, where he led worship service for the next four years.

Since 2008–present

In 2008 Winans co-wrote the song Seattle for Gospel/R&B dou Mary Mary for their platinum selling fourth studio release The Sound. The album proved to be their best charting album to date, debuting No. 7 on the Billboard 200, No. 2 on the US R&B chart, and topping the Gospel and Contemporary Christian Music charts. The album held the No. 1 position on the Billboard Gospel Albums chart for over six months after its release. Winans also collaborated with Hip-Hop legend Heavy D on his critically acclaimed, Grammy nominated album, Vibes, co-writing and singing background vocals for the song No Matter What .

The following year Winans composed the lyrics for and produced the song Need You To Fall for Michael Bolton. The song was released on Bolton's One World One Love album in September 2009 in the United Kingdom, and in the U.S. on May 4, 2010. In October 2010 Winans and his wife, Lisa, collaborated with producer Warryn Campbell to compose material for the highly anticipated Tyler Perry film, For Colored Girls . They wrote the song Sun, performed by Lalah Hathaway. It appears in both the film and on the soundtrack.

Winans once again teamed up with Warryn Campbell and Mary Mary on their fifth studio release, Something Big, co-writing Catch Me and Never Wave My Flag. The latter was performed by the group on The Tonight Show with Jay Leno March 31, 2011.

Winans has been credited with providing music for the movie Jumping the Broom. He also wrote the second single, Closer, for Bishop T.D. Jakes's Sacred Love Songs II album, performed by R&B singer Joe.

In 2011, Juan, along with Warryn Campbell, composed and produced the songs, Marchin' On, and disco era remake, Dr. Love for Jessica Reedy's debut album, From The Heart. He is also listed as a songwriter on the song Best Man, from the Dawkins & Dawkins release, From Now On, and Heavy D's, Put It All on Me, from the album entitled Love Opus, singing background on the latter.

2012 began with another Campbell/Winans collaboration, writing and producing You Should Know for Essence Music Festival winner, Greta Prince.

Juan is also featured as a songwriter on blues rocker Beth Hart's newest release Bang Bang Boom Boom, co-writing the song With You Everyday with Ms. Hart. The album was released on April 2, 2013 to great reviews.

Personal life

In the fall of 2005 Winans met and began dating recording artist Lisa Kimmey, lead singer of Contemporary Christian group Out of Eden, while attending the same church. The two were married on September 8, 2007 in Franklin, TN. Their first child, Sophia, was born in December 2010.

Juan currently divides his time between Los Angeles, and Durham, NC, where he and Lisa lead the music department at King's Park International Church.

Discography
 Beth Hart  (2012) Bang Bang Boom Boom/Composer
 Q Parker (2012) The Manual/Composer
 Tristan Wilds (2012) Remember, Remember EP, Cold/Composer, producer
 Heavy D (2011) Love Opus/Composer, Vocalist
 Dawkins & Dawkins (2011) From Now On/Composer
 Jessica Reedy (2011) From The Heart/Composer,Producer
 Sacred Love Songs Vol. 2 (2011) Closer/Composer
 Mary Mary (2011) Something Big/Composer
 For Colored Girls: Music From and Inspired by the Original Motion Picture Soundtrack (2010) Sun/Composer
 Michael Bolton (2009) One World One Love/Composer, producer
 Mary Mary (2008) The Sound/Composer
 Heavy D (2008) Vibes/Composer, Vocalist
 Marvin Winans (2007) Alone But Not Alone/Vocalist,Arranger
 BeBe Winans (2007) Cherch/Vocalist
 Matt Redman (2006) Beautiful News/Vocalist
 Out of Eden (2006) Out of Eden: The Hits/Engineer, Vocal Producer
 V Three (2006) V3/Composer, Vocal Producer
 Kirk Whalum (2005) Songs of Babyface/Vocalist
 BarlowGirl (BarlowGirl) (2004) Vocalist
 Michelle Williams (2004) Vocalist
 George Huff (2004) My Christmas EP/Vocalist, arranger
 Smokie Norful (2004) Nothing Without You/Vocalist
 BeBe Winans (2003) My Christmas Prayer
 BeBe Winans (2002) Live & Up Close/Vocalist
 Winans Phase 2 (1999) We Got Next/Artist, composer

References

Living people
1981 births
Musicians from Detroit
Winans family
21st-century American singers
21st-century African-American musicians